Lee Si-young may also refer to:

 Yi Si-yeong (1868–1953), South Korean politician who served as the first vice president
 Lee Si-young (poet) (born 1950), South Korean writer
 Lee Si-young (born 1982), South Korean actress
 Lee Si-young (footballer) (born 1997), South Korean footballer

See also